Verruca stroemia, the wart barnacle, is a species of asymmetrical sessile barnacle in the family Verrucidae.

References

External links

 

Sessilia

Crustaceans described in 1776